Acanthocercus gregorii, the blue-headed tree agama, black-necked agama, southern tree agama, or blue-throated agama, is a species of lizard in the family Agamidae. It is a small lizard found in Kenya.

References

Acanthocercus
Reptiles described in 1894
Reptiles of Kenya
Taxa named by Albert Günther